Bruce Oliver Thwaite (2 December 1923 – 21 September 1991) was an Australian Paralympic competitor. During World War II, he sustained a spinal injury when he landed on a tree after parachuting from a bomber plane over Germany. He was treated at the Stoke Mandeville Hospital.

He first represented Australia at the 1957 International Stoke Mandeville Games in archery. At the 1962 Commonwealth Paraplegic Games in Perth, he won gold medals in the Men's Swimming 50 m Crawl Class B and Men's Swimming 50 m Breaststroke Class B events, a silver medal in the Weightlifting Class B Middleweight event and a bronze medal in the Men's Precision Archery  event. He competed at the 1964 Tokyo Paralympics in swimming and weightlifting. He then took up lawn bowls. At the 1974 Commonwealth Paraplegic Games in Dunedin, he won a gold medal in the Men's Singles event and a silver medal in the Men's Pairs event. At the 1976 Toronto Games, he teamed with Eric Magennis to win the gold medal in the Men's Pairs wh event.
The first New South Wales Paraplegic Sports Club meeting was held in his jewellery shop  in the Sydney suburb of Concord.

References

External links
 

Paralympic lawn bowls players of Australia
Male Paralympic swimmers of Australia
Paralympic weightlifters of Australia
Swimmers at the 1964 Summer Paralympics
Weightlifters at the 1964 Summer Paralympics
Lawn bowls players at the 1976 Summer Paralympics
Paralympic gold medalists for Australia
Wheelchair category Paralympic competitors
Sportspeople from Sydney
1923 births
1991 deaths
Medalists at the 1976 Summer Paralympics
Australian male bowls players
Paralympic medalists in lawn bowls
Australian male swimmers
20th-century Australian people